Rock-Simplice Embingou (born 25 September 1968) is a Congolese former footballer who played as a attacking midfielder. He represented the Congo national football team at the 2000 African Cup of Nations.

References

Living people
1968 births
Republic of the Congo footballers
Sportspeople from Brazzaville
Association football midfielders
Étoile du Congo players
1. FC Lok Stendal players
VfL Halle 1896 players
1. FC Lokomotive Leipzig players
FSV Zwickau players
1. FC Gera 03 players
Regionalliga players
Oberliga (football) players
2000 African Cup of Nations players
Republic of the Congo international footballers
Republic of the Congo expatriate footballers
Expatriate footballers in Germany
Republic of the Congo expatriate sportspeople in Germany